The Mamers Valles are a set of channels in a long, winding canyon in the north of Mars. They cover 1000 km, cutting through the cratered uplands of the Arabia Terra, from the Cerulli crater to the Deuteronilus Mensae near the edge of Mars' vast northern lowlands. Through their midsection, they average a width of 25 km and a depth of 1200 meters.

Theories of canyon formation include that Mamers Valles were formed by either water or lava, with the flow from south to north and additional material flowing from the slope toward the valley floor. According to the most popular theory, linear features on the valley bottom indicate possible ice flows and that ice may currently be plentiful. The Mamers Valles are dated to the early Hesperian period, about 3.8 billion years ago.

An infeeder canyon at the northwestern edge of the Mamers Valles, near their mouth (seen at the bottom of the photo at lower right), is a box canyon.  Such canyons (with rounded headwalls and no obvious overland infeeders) have been widely presumed to have formed by a process of seepage erosion.  However, it has been suggested that this side canyon was formed by a catastrophic flood event (Lamb, 2008).  The case is supported by comparison with Box Canyon, Idaho, USA, which shows a similar morphology, but also exhibits features such as plunge pools, rock scours on the headwall rim, and a notch on the headwall rim, suggestive of large-volume flow.

The Mamers Valles were named in 1976, after the Oscan word for Mars.

Gallery

References

 Google Mars linked to Mamers Valles
 THEMIS
 THEMIS
 Lamb, Michael P. et al. (2008) "Formation of Box Canyon, Idaho, by Megaflood: Implications for Seepage Erosion on Earth and Mars", Science 320, 1067

Valleys and canyons on Mars
Ismenius Lacus quadrangle